The 2017–18 season was the 103rd season of the Isthmian League, which is an English football competition featuring semi-professional and amateur clubs from London, East and South East England. It was also the twelfth season for the current incarnations of the Premier, North and South Divisions, the last to have two regional divisions, and the first as the Bostik League following a sponsorship deal with Bostik.

In May 2017, the FA chose the Southern League to create one additional division at Step 3 and the Isthmian League to create one at Step 4 as part of the next change to the structure, and in March 2018, the Northern Premier League voted to reorganise its Step 4 divisions into an east-west alignment, with all Step 3 divisions contracting to 22 clubs and those at Step 4 to 20, taking effect in the 2018–19 season.

Premier Division

The Premier Division consisted of 24 clubs: 19 clubs from the previous season, and five new clubs:

Brightlingsea Regent, promoted as champions of Division One North
Dorking Wanderers, promoted as play-off winners in Division One South
Margate, relegated from the National League South
Thurrock, promoted as play-off winners in Division One North
Tooting & Mitcham United, promoted as champions of Division One South

Billericay Town won the division and returned to National League South after five seasons in the Isthmian League. Dulwich Hamlet, who competed in the Isthmian League since its establishment in 1907, won the play-offs and followed them. Only one club were to relegate from the Premier Division, Tooting & Mitcham finished bottom of the table and returned straight back to the step 4.

At the end of the season a new step 3 division was created under the Southern Football League, seven Premier Division clubs were transferred to the Southern League Premier divisions. Number of clubs in the Premier Division were reduced to 22 for the next season.

League table

Top scorers

Play-offs

Results table

Stadia and locations

North Division

North Division consisted of 24 clubs: 17 clubs from the previous season, and seven new clubs:
AFC Sudbury, relegated from the Premier Division
Barking, promoted from the Essex Senior League
Canvey Island, relegated from the Premier Division
Grays Athletic, relegated from the Premier Division
Hertford Town, promoted from the Spartan South Midlands League
Mildenhall Town, promoted from the Eastern Counties League
Potters Bar Town, transferred from Southern League Division One Central

At the end of the season a new step 3 division were to be created, thus for this season three clubs were to be promoted from each step 4 divisions - champions, runners-up and play-off winners plus one third-placed club with highest points-per-game. Hornchurch won the division and returned to the Premier Division after three seasons in the North Division along with runners-up Potters Bar Town and play-off winners Haringey Borough who never competed at such level. Due to league system restructurisation only one club were to be relegated from step 4 divisions. Norwich United finished bottom of the table and returned to the Eastern Counties League after two seasons in the Isthmian League.

At the end of the season seventh step 4 division was created under the Isthmian League, as the South Division clubs were distributed between new South East and South Central divisions. Four North Division clubs were transferred to South Central Division. Number of clubs in the step 4 divisions were reduced to 20 for the next season.

League table

Top scorers

Play-offs

Results table

Stadia and locations

South Division

South Division consisted of 24 clubs: 19 clubs from the previous season, and seven new clubs:
Ashford United, promoted from the Southern Counties East League
Phoenix Sports, transferred from Division One North
Shoreham, promoted from the Southern Combination League
Thamesmead Town, transferred from Division One North
VCD Athletic, transferred from Division One North

At the end of the season a new step 3 division were to be created, thus for this season three clubs were to be promoted from each step 4 divisions - champions, runners-up and play-off winners plus one third-placed club with highest points-per-game. Carshalton Athletic won the division and returned to the Premier Division after four seasons in the South Division along with runners-up Lewes, who spent in the South Division two seasons after the relegation from Premier Division. Play-off winners Walton Casuals were promoted to the Southern League Premier Division South - the highest level they competed in their history. Corinthian-Casuals lost in play-off final but were promoted to the Premier Division as step 4 play-off final loser with highest points-per-game ratio after Thurrock from Premier Division folded. Corinthian-Casuals last competed in top division of the Isthmian League in 1973–74 season. Due to league system restructurisation only one club were to be relegated from step 4 divisions. Shoreham finished bottom of the table and returned straight back to the Southern Combination League.

At the end of the season seventh step 4 division was created under the Isthmian League, as the South Division clubs were distributed between new South East and South Central divisions. Number of clubs in the step 4 divisions were reduced to 20 for the next season.

League table

Top scorers

Play-offs

Results table

Stadia and locations

League Cup

The 2017–18 Alan Turvey Trophy (formerly the Isthmian League Cup) was the 44th season of the Alan Turvey Trophy, the cup competition of the whole Isthmian League.

Calendar

The Isthmian League Cup was voluntary this season, nine clubs decided not to take part in the competition:

Cray Wanderers
Dereham Town
Guernsey
Hastings United
Lewes

Lowestoft Town
Needham Market
Norwich United
Thurrock

First round
Sixty two clubs participated in the first round, while one club received a bye to the second round:
Hendon

Second round
Thirty clubs to have made it through the first round were entered into the draw with two clubs who get a bye, making thirty-two teams.

Third round

Quarterfinals

Semifinals

Final

Awards

Premier Division

North Division

South Division

See also
Isthmian League
2017–18 Northern Premier League
2017–18 Southern League

References

External links
Official website

2017-18
7